Anthony Anholt (19 January 1941 – 26 July 2002) was a British television actor, known for his role as Charles Frere in the BBC drama series Howards' Way (1985–90). In 1974 he was cast as Mark Colebrook, a crooked architect in Contact Breaker the 12th episode of the first series of the police drama, The Sweeney. Anholt appeared in an episode of Juliet Bravo in 1984 as Martin Lee.

His other appearances include Gerry Anderson's Space: 1999 (1976–77) playing the role of Security Chief Tony Verdeschi in the second series, and The Protectors (1972–74) as Paul Buchet. His only credited film role was as an FBI agent in Fear Is the Key in 1972; he also made appearances in the 1984 miniseries The Last Days of Pompeii and as small time crook Abdul, in the Only Fools and Horses episode To Hull and Back. He died after a long illness caused by a brain tumour on 26 July 2002.

Early life and education
Anholt was born in Singapore to an Anglo-Dutch family. They moved to Australia before the end of the Second World War, then to South Africa for a brief time, eventually settling in the United Kingdom, where Anholt was educated at Cranleigh School in south Surrey. His father had been taken prisoner by the Japanese, was forced to work on the Burma Railway, and died when his son was three. His mother remarried five years later.

Personal life
Anholt married and divorced twice. His first marriage was to Sheila Willet in 1964; they had a son, Christien, who is also an actor. Anholt and Willet divorced in 1986. His second marriage was to actress Tracey Childs, his co-star in Howards' Way. They married in 1990, and divorced eight years later.

Career
Anholt was originally a continuity announcer for the BBC World Service. His last filmed acting work was for Canadian television productions; he appeared in small roles in several episodes of Lexx and also guest-starred in his son Christien's series, Relic Hunter as the character of Vincent de Bourdin, Series 1, episode 19 (title "Love Letter", aired 1 May 2000).

Death 
Anholt died in London of a brain tumour in 2002, aged 61.

Filmography

References

External links 

1941 births
2002 deaths
People educated at Cranleigh School
British male television actors
British people of Dutch descent
Deaths from brain cancer in England